James Hawes is a British television director.

James Hawes may also refer to:
James Hawes (mayor), Lord Mayor of London
James Hawes (author) (born 1960), British novelist and screenwriter
James Morrison Hawes (1824–1889), American soldier